Epimactis pulsatella is a moth in the family Lecithoceridae. It was described by John David Bradley in 1961. It is found on Guadalcanal.

References

Moths described in 1961
Epimactis